Soyuz TMA-2 was a Soyuz (Russian Союз ТМА-2, Union TMA-2) mission to the International Space Station (ISS)  launched by a Soyuz FG launch vehicle. The spacecraft docked with the ISS on April 28, 2003 and undocked on October 10, 2003. Soyuz TMA-2 was the second flight for the TMA modification of the Soyuz spacecraft, and the 6th Soyuz to fly to the ISS.

The commander was Yuri Ivanovich Malenchenko (Russia), and the flight engineer was Edward Tsang Lu (USA). After docking with the ISS they exchanged with the resident crew on ISS and became the seventh station crew, called "ISS Expedition Seven". Alexander Kaleri and Michael Foale were assigned as the backup crew.

Crew

Original Crew

Mission parameters
Mass: 7136 kg
Perigee: 200 km
Apogee: 250 km
Inclination: 51.7°
Period: 88.7 min

Docking with ISS
Docked to ISS: April 28, 2003, 05:56 UTC (to nadir port of Zarya)
Undocked from ISS: October 27, 2003, 23:17 UTC (from nadir port of Zarya)

Mission highlights
Originally the Soyuz missions to the ISS were all planned to be only taxi mission to deliver a new Soyuz spacecraft as the station's lifeboat every six month with a visiting crew, but not for crew exchange. Until the Space Shuttle Columbia disaster the same was planned for Soyuz TMA-2, a visiting crew consisting of commander Gennady Padalka and ESA-astronaut Pedro Duque were to spend about one week at the station and then return with the previous Soyuz TMA-1 spacecraft. The third seat might have gone to the Chilean Klaus von Storch as a Chilean space agency (Agencia Chilena del Espacio) cosmonaut, but even before the Columbia disaster it looked like his flight would not happen, and the seat would go to the Russian cosmonaut Oleg Kotov or to deliver freight to the station.

During his stay on the station, Malenchenko became the first person to get married in space. His bride was in Texas where long distance marriages are legal.

The spacecraft returned to Earth on October 28, with both the "Expedition 7" crew as well as Pedro Duque on board. Duque was launched with Soyuz TMA-3 and spent only one week on board of the ISS.

References

External links

 RussianSpaceWeb.com: Soyuz TMA-2
 SpaceRef.com: Soyuz TMA-2/6S Lands On Target

Crewed Soyuz missions
Spacecraft launched in 2003
Spacecraft which reentered in 2003
Spacecraft launched by Soyuz-FG rockets